Julep may refer to:

 Mint julep, a mixed alcoholic drink, or cocktail, consisting primarily of bourbon (or some other spirit) and fresh mint
 Mint Julep (film)
 "One Mint Julep", a song
 Julep (company), a company that sells cosmetics
 "Julep", a song by Punch Brothers from the album The Phosphorescent Blues
 Gibeau Orange Julep, a fast food restaurant and tourist attraction in Montreal